The Manhattan Project is the debut solo project by American rapper, Carter Ace, released for free with Bandcamp on May 20, 2015. The project was also added to music streaming sites Spotify and Rdio.

Release
The Manhattan Project was a surprise release for free download at 8:00 p.m. on May 20, 2015. The album was due to be released Fall 2015 but was pushed due to complications with the release. Preceding the album was the single, "Don't Waste My Time", which features additional vocals from Julianne Sillona.

Artwork
The album cover artwork was tweeted by Carter himself on his Twitter page. The official artwork was released along with the album on May 22. The artwork is a cartooned painting of the artist screaming over a black background.

Track listing
 All songs produced by Carter Ace

References 

2015 debut EPs
Hip hop EPs